Șalaru is a Romanian surname. Notable people with the surname include:

Anatol Șalaru (born 1962), Moldovan politician
Gheorghe Șalaru (born 1961), Moldovan politician

Romanian-language surnames